State seal may refer to one of the following:

National seals
State Seal of Japan
State Seal of Myanmar

Sub-national seals
One of the state seals of the Russian Empire
One of the seals of the U.S. states